A biodiversity reserve of Quebec is a protected area established to promote maintenance of biodiversity in the terrestrial environment and more specifically to maintain representatives of the various natural regions of Quebec, Canada.
There are five biodiversity reserves in Quebec with permanent protection status.

Definition

The main difference from national parks is that there is no systematic development or establishment of service infrastructure or recreational or educational activities organized by the government. 
In addition, hunting and trapping activities, occupations such as vacationing and recreational activities such as hiking, biking, snowmobiling or motor boating are permitted. 
These are protected areas where, in general, only industrial activities exploiting natural resources are prohibited, while access and traffic are free.

Biodiversity reserves are managed by the Quebec Ministry of Sustainable Development, Environment, Wildlife and Parks.

Biodiversity reserve, along with aquatic reserve, is a status set up to provide Québec with a network of protected areas that must include representative samples of all types of ecosystems. 
This level of representation is determined by the Quebec Reference Ecological Framework, which ensures an adequate spatial distribution of protected areas in Quebec.

List of Quebec biodiversity reserves

Proposed biodiversity reserves 

The ministry has set aside several territories for the creation of future biodiversity reserves.
In general, this proposed status is valid for a period of 4 years. 
Some of the proposed biodiversity reserves protect areas that are under study with a view to creating national parks:

Albanel-Témiscamie-Otish]] (proposed park)
Anneaux-Forestiers
Baie-de-Boatswain
Basses-Collines-du-Lac-au-Sorcier
Basses-Collines-du-Lac-Coucou
Basses-Collines-du-Lac-Guernesé
Basses-Collines-du-Ruisseau-Serpent
Brûlis-du-Lac-Frégate
Brûlis-du-Lac-Oskélanéo
Buttes-du-Lac-Montjoie
Canyon-de-la-Rivière-aux-Rats
Collines-de-Brador
Collines-de-Muskuchii
Côte-d’Harrington Harbour (projet de parc)
Domaine-La-Vérendrye
Dunes-de-la-Rivière-Attic
Esker-Mistaouac
Estuaire-des-Rivières-Koktac-et-Nauberakvik
Fjord-Tursukattaq
Forêt-Montmorency
Grandes-Piles
Hirondelle
Îles-de-l’Est-du-Pipmuacan
Îles-du-Kiamika
Kangiqsujuaq
Lac-Berté
Lac-Dana
Lac-Gensart
Lac-Ménistouc
Lac-Némiscachingue
Lac-Onistagane
Lac-Pasteur
Lac-Plétipi
Lac-Saint-Cyr
Lac-Sérigny
Lac-Taibi
Lac-Wetetnagami
Marais-du-Lac-Parent
Massif-des-Lacs-Belmont-et-Magpie
Montagne-Blanches
Montagne-du-Diable
Mont-O’Brien
Mont-Sainte-Marie
Monts Groulx
Opémican 
Paakumshumwaau-Maatuskaau
Paul-Provencher
Péninsule-de-Ministikawatin
Plaine-de-la-Missisicabi
Plateau-de-la-Pierriche
Quaqtaq-Kangirsuk
Réservoir-Decelles
Rivière-de-la-Racine-de-Bouleau
Rivière-Delay
Rivière-Vachon
Ruisseau-Niquet
Seigneurie-du-Triton
Sikitakan Sipi
Station-de-Biologie-des-Laurentides
Tourbières-Boisées-du-Chiwakamu
Vallée-de-la-Rivière-Godbout
Vallée-de-la-Rivière-Maganasipi
Vallée-de-la-Rivière-Natashquan (projet de parc)
Vallée-Tousignant
Wanaki
Waskaganish

Notes

Sources

Quebec
Protected areas of Quebec